Amara Karunakaran (born 1984), known professionally as Amara Karan, is an English actress who made her film début as Rita in Wes Anderson's The Darjeeling Limited. The film premièred at the 2007 Venice Film Festival. Karan's second film role was as schoolgirl Peaches in the 2007 film St Trinian's.

She made her stage début in 2008 as Jessica in an RSC production of The Merchant of Venice and as Bianca in an RSC production of The Taming of the Shrew. With the latter, she made her West End debut at the Novello Theatre. In 2016, she co-starred on the HBO crime drama mini-series, The Night Of. In 2012 she co-starred in the film A Fantastic Fear of Everything.

Background
Karan was born in Wimbledon, London in 1984 to Sri Lankan Tamil parents who had emigrated from Zambia to Britain two years before she was born. She was brought up in Wimbledon and attended Wimbledon High School.

Karan went on to study at St Catherine's College, Oxford and while there began acting in amateur plays including Sunday Morning at the Centre of the World at the Burton Taylor Theatre for which she received rave reviews and was also singled out for her performance in When We Are Married at the Old Fire Station theatre. During her time at Oxford, Karan wrote, directed, produced, and acted in a short film, By Myself, which came in second place in the 2002 Shoestring Shorts Competition.

She began her career as an investment banker (at Hawkpoint and CIBC World Markets) specialising in mergers and acquisitions, before studying for an MA degree in acting at The Arts Educational Schools London.

She carried the 2008 Olympic Torch during its time in London.

Since 2016 she has been in a relationship with the actor Jamie de Courcey.

Filmography

Film

Television

Radio

Theatre

Video games

References

External links
 
 
Amara Karan article
JADOO – Amara Karan – Complete Interview

1984 births
Actresses from London
Living people
English people of Sri Lankan Tamil descent
People educated at the Arts Educational Schools
English film actresses
English Hindus
English television actresses
English stage actresses
English radio actresses
Royal Shakespeare Company members
English Shakespearean actresses
Alumni of St Catherine's College, Oxford
People educated at Wimbledon High School
People from Wimbledon, London